Romans 8 is the eighth chapter of the Epistle to the Romans in the New Testament of the Christian Bible. It was authored by Paul the Apostle, while he was in Corinth in the mid-50s AD, with the help of an amanuensis (secretary), Tertius, who added his own greeting in Romans 16:22. Chapter 8 concerns "the Christian's spiritual life."

The reformer Martin Luther stated that this chapter is where Paul "comforts fighters" involved in an inner struggle between spirit and flesh:

Text
The original text was written in Koine Greek. This chapter is divided into 39 verses.

Textual witnesses
Some early manuscripts containing the text of this chapter are:
Papyrus 27 (3rd century; extant verses 12–22, 24–27)
Codex Vaticanus (325–350)
Codex Sinaiticus (330–360)
Codex Alexandrinus (400–440)
Codex Ephraemi Rescriptus (~450; complete)

Old Testament references
 Romans 8:36 references Psalm 44:22

The Spirit of life (8:1–13)
This part deals with the Christian's deliverance from condemnation, which is the penalty of death because of the sin people are living under, by virtue of believers' union with Christ (Romans 5:12–21).

Verse 1

The discourse in the previous chapter continues in Romans 8:1 with the illative word , generally translated as 'so' or 'therefore', or 'consequently' in Thayer's Greek Lexicon. The vocabulary and the content of verse 1 point back to the end of chapter 5 as the basis of the conclusion which Paul starts with 'therefore'. Paul argues that Christians are set free from the condemnation (cf. verses 16 and 18) caused by Adam because they have been joined to Jesus Christ. This he iterates after his digression in chapters 6–7.

Methodist founder John Wesley concurs that Paul "resumes the thread of his discourse" from Romans 7:1–7, following a digression (in Romans 7:8–25) regarding sin and the Mosaic Law:

Whereas theologians Heinrich Meyer and Harold Buls are content to link the inference with the immediately preceding text:

Buls explains that Paul's "real self" serving God is his mind and not his flesh.

Meyer goes on to distinguish between two alternative readings of "There is[...] now no condemnation to those who are in Christ Jesus":

"now, after Christ [as deliverer from the law of sin, Romans 8:2], has interposed, there is no condemnation ..." or
" one must be in Christ, in order to get rid of every condemnation".
 
He prefers the former reading "as a matter of fact that has become historical" rather than the latter reading, attributed to Lutheran theologian Johann Hofmann.

The Spirit of adoption (8:14–17)
Continuing the theme of 'life' in verses 1–13, the following paragraph (verses 14–17) deals with 'sonship', describing "the wonderful and comforting truth that Christians have been adopted into God's own family, so God's Spirit can confer life on us (13–14) and we can be  with a glorious prospect for the future (17–18)". Thus, this short passage provides a transition between the previous and the next part.

The Spirit of glory (8:18–30)
In verses 18–30, Paul further develops his whole theme of Christian assurance, which he started in chapter 5, elaborating on the Christian's hope of glory, based on the knowledge that "God has determined to bring us though to our inheritance" (18–22, 29–30), providentially working on behalf of his children (verse 28) and having given his Spirit as the guarantee for their final redemption (verse 30).

Verse 28

Verse 28 can be seen in the context of verses 29–30 (and in larger context: verses 18–39) that "those who love God" are not promised to only experience good things, but would also suffer the woes and persecution of the present age, yet God can use all these to his divine purpose, and he has everything under control.

Verse 29

"Image" ('icon'): alluding to the creation account of Genesis 1:26, that the believers will share the character of Christ.

Verse 30

"Justified": as in Romans 1:16, 'justification' here in a combination of two ideas: (1) that "God credits to believers the status of righteousness" and (2) that "God empowers believers to live righteously"; both are stated in verse 29 (God's purpose that believers "be conformed to the image of his Son"), so the believers will share the future glory (being one "within a large family"; verse 30, cf. 1 Corinthians 15:20).

God's everlasting love (8:31–39)
Anglican Bishop Charles Ellicott describes the final section of chapter 8 (verses 31–39) as "a sublime and triumphant conclusion" and Erasmus of Rotterdam remarks that "Cicero never said anything grander".

Verse 31

Greek New Testament:

"These things": The Living Bible translates as 'these wonderful things'. By "these things", according to William Reed Newell, "Paul evidently indicates not only the whole process of our salvation by Christ, from chapter three onward, with that great deliverance by the help of the Holy Spirit set forth in this eighth chapter[...] but also[...] what he has been telling us of the purpose of God: "Whom He foreknew, foreordained, called, justified, glorified!"

"If God be for us, who can be against us?" became widespread as a motto.
It is an aria for Soprano in Handel's Messiah (1741).

Verse 32

"Spared": translated from the Greek word . Hill regards this verse 32 "especially poignant* as it borrows the language from the account of the binding of Isaac in Genesis 22 (Genesis 22:12: "you have not withheld your son, your only son"; the Greek Septuagint renders 'withheld" as ), but God made the sacrifice, that even Abraham was spared.

Verse 35

The list of "hardship (KJV: 'tribulation')[...] or sword" recalls the real afflictions that the people of Israel experienced in history, as summarized in the quote in verse 36.

Verse 36

The citation from Psalm 44:22 in Greek is exactly as in the Septuagint (numbered as Psalm 43:22).

More than conquerors

Verse 37

"We are more than conquerors" translated from a single Greek word , a word probably coined by Paul himself, "who loves compounds with ".

A hymn to God's love

Verses 38–39

The New Jerusalem Bible suggests that the "principalities", "like 'angels' and 'princes' are among the mysterious cosmic or elemental forces which to the mind of antiquity were in general hostile to humanity. The 'heights' and 'depths' represent Heaven and Hell, also conceived as powers."

Uses

Music
The King James Version of verse 34 from this chapter is cited as texts in the English-language oratorio "Messiah" by George Frideric Handel (HWV 56).

See also
Binding of Isaac
Quis separabit?
 Related Bible parts: Genesis 22, Psalm 44, Romans 1, 2 Thessalonians 2

Notes

References

Sources

External links

  King James Bible - Wikisource
English Translation with Parallel Latin Vulgate
Online Bible at GospelHall.org (ESV, KJV, Darby, American Standard Version, Bible in Basic English)
Multiple bible versions at Bible Gateway (NKJV, NIV, NRSV etc.)
Commentary on Romans 8 at TheBibleSays

08